Kenny Benkowski (March 27, 1937 – February 2, 2023), better known by his ring name, Kenny "Sodbuster" Jay, was an American professional wrestler, best known for his appearances with the American Wrestling Association.

Jay primarily performed as a jobber. He was often paired with fellow AWA jobber Jake "The Milkman" Milliman in tag team matches. During his career, he was known for his stiff wrestling style.

Early life
Kenny Jay was born on March 27, 1937, in Holdingford, Minnesota. Kenny was a natural athlete in high school, lettering in both football and shot put. When he graduated from high school in 1955, he moved to Milwaukee, Wisconsin, where he found employment as a factory worker.

Professional wrestling career

Early career; military service
His first match was at the Southside Armory for John Hinds. Before long he was working larger venues at the Marigold Arena in Chicago.  His wrestling career took a hiatus when he joined the U.S. Army for a two-year stint.

American Wrestling Association (1962–1985, 1990)
After his military tour, he found employment with the American Wrestling Association (AWA), wrestling every Saturday's television taping and then house shows during the week for promoter Wally Karbo.

Whenever a new name would come in, they would give them to Jay to make them look good. He used his mat-based scientific wrestling style with the likes of Mad Dog Vachon, The Crusher, Verne Gagne, Jesse The Body Ventura, Jerry Blackwell, Bobby Heenan, Mr. Saito, and Bruiser Brody.

To help pay the bills, Jay started his own landscape business, which is where he got the "Sodbuster" nickname. He never left the Midwest, as he was rooted in the area with his landscape business, wife, and three children.

Early career highlights included several overseas trips to Japan, beginning in 1972, where he worked 18 matches (including five cage matches), winning most of them. Later in 1976 he took on Muhammad Ali in a boxer vs wrestler bout that also featured Verne Gagne as the Referee, a match Kenny Jay considered one of the high points of his career.

In 1984 The Sodbuster also appeared as a tag-team partner with legendary wrestler Baron Von Raschke.

In 1985 he retired from wrestling. He came out of retirement in 1990.

Jay continued working for the AWA for nearly thirty years until they went out of business in 1991.

Later career (1990–2012)
Jay later wrestled in North Premier Wrestling with J.B. Trask, Lenny Lane, Jerry Lynn, "Mr. Everything" Dan Jesser and his enemy the Texas Badman.
Jay occasionally wrestled for several promotions in the 1990s and 2000s primarily appearing in the State of Minnesota. He wrestled his last match in 2012 at 75 years old.

In 2005 the Cauliflower Alley Club board of directors unanimously chose Kenny Jay to be honored.

Death
On February 2, 2023, it was announced that Jay had died at the age of 85.

Championships and accomplishments
American Wrestling Association Champion
Other honoree (2005)

References

External links

1937 births
2023 deaths
20th-century professional wrestlers
21st-century professional wrestlers
American male professional wrestlers
People from Stearns County, Minnesota
Professional wrestlers from Minnesota